Edward Grose-Hodge (15 January 1855 - 2 April 1928) was a priest in the Church of England, a prebendary of St Paul’s Cathedral and Whitehead Professor of Divinity at the London College of Divinity.

Career

He was Whitehead Professor of Divinity at the London College of Divinity for 22 years. He was appointed a prebendary of St Paul’s Cathedral in 1911.

He was appointed:
Vicar of Holy Trinity Church, Leicester 1890 - 1894 
Vicar of St James’ Church, Holloway 1894 - 1897
Rector of Holy Trinity Church, Marylebone 1897 - 1911
Vicar of St James' Church, Paddington 1911 - 1919
Rector of St Martin in the Bull Ring 1919 - 1925

Family

He married Florence Amy Smith in 1887 and they had four children:
Florence Evelyn Grose-Hodge (1888 - 1912)
Humfrey Grose-Hodge (1891 - 1962)
Dorrien Edward Grose-Hodge (1893 - 1915)
Geoffrey Goldingham Grose-Hodge (1896 - 1962)

Notes

1855 births
1928 deaths
19th-century English Anglican priests
20th-century English Anglican priests